George Soule Spencer (1874 – 1949) was an American actor who appeared on stage and in silent films including in lead roles. He was married to Lillian White Spencer. They wrote The Flower of Chivalry in 1901.

He starred in the film The Evangelist (1916) with Gladys Hanson. He also starred in The College Widow (1915) with Ethel Clayton.

Partial filmography

The Third Degree (1913) as Richard Brewster
The Wolf (1914) as Jules Beaubien Ferdinand
The Daughters of Men (1914) as John Stedman 
The Fortune Hunter (1914) as Harry Kellogg  
The Lion and the Mouse (1914) as John Burkett Ryder
The Sporting Duchess (1915) as Lord Desborough 
The Climbers (1915) as Ned Warden 
The College Widow (1915) as Billy Bolton
The Great Ruby (1915)
The Evangelist (1916)

References

External links

American male stage actors
American male silent film actors
20th-century American male actors
American male actors
1874 births
1975 deaths